Providence University (PU) is a Catholic co-educational institution in Shalu District, Taichung City, Taiwan. Providence University is one of the U12 Consortium member schools, and is one of two Taiwan universities participating in the ISEP network.

History 

Providence University was founded by an American congregation, the Sisters of Providence of Saint Mary-of-the-Woods (Indiana, United States). In the summer of 1919, Bishop Joseph Tacconi of Kaifeng, Henan Province, Republic of China, met with Sisters of Providence general superior Mother Mary Cleophas Foley to request sisters for a school for young women in Kaifeng. In 1921 Mother Marie Gratia Luking (1885–1964) and five other Sisters of Providence founded the Hua-Mei Girls' Elementary and High Schools there, one of the first schools for girls in China. In the spring of 1929, the school was forced to close because of political turbulence.

The Providence Sisters, enthusiastic about female education, endeavored to establish another school in spite of the critical situation. In 1932, by the effort of the Board of Trustees, Ching-Yi Girls' High School was instituted in Kaifeng. Cardinal Paul Yü Pin was the first chairperson of the Board of Trustees, and Chi-Liang Ing was the first president of the school. In 1942, Mother Gratia and the other sisters were imprisoned and did not regain their freedom until 1945.

In 1948, the Chinese Civil War forced the sisters to retreat first to Shanghai and later to Taiwan.

In July 1989, it has turned into "Providence University for Women". From 1993, it turned into "Providence University", and started to enroll male students.

Successive principals

Academics

Campus Building

Anthony Guo Hall 
This building is named after the memorial of 4th principal of school: Anthony Guo. Inside the building is College of Humanities and Social Sciences, College of Continuing Education, Department of Law, Department of Mass Communication, Department of Social Work and Child Welfare, Art Center, Center for Computer & Communication and International Conference Hall.

St. Peter Hall

Luking Library

Jing An Hall

Theodore Guerin Hall

Providence Hall

St. Francis Hall

Our Lady of Providence Convent

Si Yuan Hall

Bishop Kupfer Hall

Jing-yuan Cafeteria

Schultz Hall

Yi-yuan Cafeteria

Zhi Shan Hall

St. Bosco Hall

John Paul II Sports Hall

Indoor Swimming Pool

Stadium

Multi-Purpose Court

Transportation

Taichung City Bus

Taichung Bus 

 Route 300
 Route 304
 Route 307
 Route 309
 Route 310
 Route 659

United Highway Bus 

 Route 300
 Route 301
 Route 303
 Route 308
 Route 309
 Route 310
 Route 326

CTbus 

 Route 162
 Route 302

GEYA Bus 

 Route 68
 Route 167
 Route 300
 Route 305
 Route 306
 Route 309
 Route 310
 Route 353

Kuo-kuang Motor 

 Route A2

Freeway Bus

Ho-hsin Bus 

 Route 7511

Road 

 Taiwan Boulevard
 Taichung Interchange, Freeway 1 (Taiwan)
 Shalu Interchange, Freeway 3 (Taiwan)

Taiwan Railway 

 Shalu Station
 Taichung Main Station

See also
 List of universities in Taiwan

References

External links

 

1956 establishments in Taiwan
Association of Christian Universities and Colleges in Asia
Educational institutions established in 1956
Catholic universities and colleges in Taiwan
Sisters of Providence of Saint Mary-of-the-Woods
Universities and colleges in Taichung
Universities and colleges in Taiwan
Comprehensive universities in Taiwan